Sir Oliver Mowat Collegiate Institute (Sir Oliver Mowat CI, SOMCI, or Mowat) is a public high school located in Toronto, Ontario, Canada. It is located in the Port Union neighbourhood of the former suburb of Scarborough. Now part of the Toronto District School Board, the school was opened in 1970 by the Scarborough Board of Education.

The school is named after Oliver Mowat, the Premier of Ontario from 1872 to 1896. Its motto is De Monte Alto ("From a mount high").

History
The school was built in 1969 and was opened on September 8, 1970, as the fourteenth collegiate institute for Scarborough. The school officially opened on April 30, 1971. Mowat named for Sir Oliver Mowat, a Father of Confederation and former Ontario premier. As of April 2015, there were 1077 students enrolled at Mowat. The school originally celebrated its 50th anniversary in April 2020 but COVID-19 pandemic restrictions prevented celebrations from taking place.

Overview
Sir Oliver Mowat is located near the intersection of Port Union Road and Lawrence Avenue East. For years, Mowat has been renowned for its woodworking facility for the Grade 9 integrated and design programs. The automotive shop has a new professional garage.

Students at Mowat Collegiate are offered academic programs with a wide variety of subjects from which to plan their individual timetables. Courses are available in Art, Business, Computer Science, Drama, English, Family Studies, Modern Languages, Geography, History, Mathematics, Music, Cooperative Education, Health and Physical Education, and Science and Technology. Sir Oliver Mowat is a semestered school.

The school mascot was originally named after the Queen's University Golden Gaels.  The school has since adopted (via a 2002 student-led referendum) the "Mustangs" as its school mascot and team name.  The school's mascot is named "Monte" after the school's Latin motto.  The school colours (derived from the Queen's Tricolour) have remained the same.

Extra-curriculars
Student Administrative Council, Prefects Council, Mowat Athletic Council, Mowat Cultural Council, Mowat Misprints (the school newspaper) and many more.

Feeder schools
 Chief Dan George Public School
 Joseph Howe Senior Public School
 Rouge Valley Public School 
 William G. Miller Public School
 Joseph Brant Public School
 Charles Gordon Public School (out of area)

Notable alumni
Jim Creeggan - musician
Steve Dangle - sports analyst, best selling author, and internet personality.

Arms

See also
 List of high schools in Ontario

References

External links
 Sir Oliver Mowat Collegiate Institute
 TDSB Profile
 Mowat Student Council

Schools in the TDSB
High schools in Toronto
Education in Scarborough, Toronto
Educational institutions established in 1970
1970 establishments in Ontario